The Eighth Street Bridge is a girder bridge connecting Cranberry Township and Franklin, Pennsylvania. The current 1986 structure is similar to several others that were constructed along the river during the same era; it replaced a 1920s truss bridge that was an original construction from the founding of U.S. Route 322.

See also
List of crossings of the Allegheny River

References

NationalBridges

Bridges over the Allegheny River
Bridges completed in 1986
Bridges in Venango County, Pennsylvania
Road bridges in Pennsylvania
U.S. Route 322
Bridges of the United States Numbered Highway System
Girder bridges in the United States